Erebothrix is a monotypic moth genus of the family Erebidae. Its only species, Erebothrix semiusta, is found in Brazil. Both the genus and the species were first described by Warren in 1889.

References

Calpinae
Monotypic moth genera